Matthew M. Gabler (born July 13, 1983) is an American politician who formerly represented the 75th Pennsylvania House of Representatives District from 2009 until 2020.

Early life and education 
Gabler graduated valedictorian from DuBois Central Catholic High School. He earned a Bachelor of Arts degree in political science in 2006 with a minor in physics from Bucknell University.

Career
Following graduation from Bucknell University, Gabler was commissioned to serve as a 2nd lieutenant in the United States Army Reserve. He served as commander of the Headquarters and Headquarters Detachment, 424th Multifunctional Medical Battalion before accepting his assignment as a medical logistics officer with the Headquarters, 28th Infantry Division, Pennsylvania Army National Guard. In 2018, then-Captain Gabler was deployed to the Middle East with the 28th Division. The 28th Division was there to provide mission command to troops supporting Operation Spartan Shield. During his deployment, Gabler was promoted to the rank of Major. Prior to being elected to represent the 75th Pennsylvania House of Representatives District, Gabler was a research analyst for the Pennsylvania House of Representatives Republican caucus. In 2008, Gabler was elected to the Pennsylvania House of Representatives and went on to serve a total six terms before deciding to not run for reelection in 2020.

References

Living people
Republican Party members of the Pennsylvania House of Representatives
Bucknell University alumni
1983 births
21st-century American politicians
People from DuBois, Pennsylvania